The Zhumabao Formation is a geological formation in Shanxi, China whose strata date back to the Late Cretaceous. Dinosaur remains are among the fossils that have been recovered from the formation.

Vertebrate paleofauna
 Microceratus sp. (formerly known as Microceratops)

See also

 List of dinosaur-bearing rock formations

References

Geologic formations of China
Upper Cretaceous Series of Asia
Cretaceous China
Paleontology in Shanxi